Yreka is the county seat of Siskiyou County, California, United States, near the Shasta River; the city has an area of about , most of it land. As of the 2020 United States Census, the population was 7,807, reflecting a meager increase from 7,765 counted in the 2010 Census. Yreka is home to the College of the Siskiyous, Klamath National Forest Interpretive Museum and the Siskiyou County Museum.

History
In March 1851, Abraham Thompson, a mule train packer, discovered gold near Rocky Gulch while traveling along the Siskiyou Trail from southern Oregon. By April 1851, 2,000 miners had arrived in "Thompson's Dry Diggings" to test their luck, and by June 1851, a gold rush "boomtown" of tents, shanties, and a few rough cabins had sprung up. Several name changes occurred until the city was called Yreka.

Mark Twain tells a different story:

In 1853–54, poet Joaquin Miller described Yreka as a bustling place with "a tide of people up and down and across other streets, as strong as if a city on the East Coast". Incorporation proceedings were completed on April 21, 1857.

Lynchings
There have been two documented lynchings in Yreka. The first took place on August 26, 1895, when four men—William Null, Garland Stemler, Luis Moreno, and Lawrence Johnson—awaiting trial for various charges of murder and robbery, were simultaneously hanged by a lynch mob from a railroad tie suspended from two adjacent trees.

The second lynching occurred on July 28, 1935. Clyde Johnson and Robert Miller Barr robbed a local business and its patrons in Castella, California. They then stole a car from a patron and drove north to Dunsmuir, California, where they planned to abandon the car and make a getaway by train. Soon after they abandoned the car north of Dunsmuir, they were stopped by California Highway Patrolman George "Molly" Malone and Dunsmuir honorary Chief of Police, 38-year-old Frank R. "Jack" Daw. Johnson pulled out a Luger pistol and wounded both policemen. Malone recovered, but Daw died the next day. Johnson was caught a few hours later by a dragnet and taken into custody. Barr, who was holding the $35 that they got from the robbery, panicked during the shootout and ran off into the woods, then escaped on a freight train. Daw was a beloved figure in Dunsmuir. His title of Chief of Police was given to him because of his cool head and experience as a World War I veteran. The night of Daw's funeral a dozen cars from Dunsmuir, carrying approximately 50 masked men, drove north to Yreka to lynch Johnson. On August 3, 1935, at 1:30 a.m., the vigilante mob reached the Yreka jail and lightly knocked on the door. Deputy Marin Lange, the only guard on duty at the jail, opened the door slightly and was quickly overtaken. He was driven nine miles east of Yreka where he was released, barefoot. The mob searched the jail, found Johnson, drove him away in one of the cars and hanged him from a pine tree. Barr was arrested over a year later, on September 4, 1936, in Los Angeles on a burglary charge. During his time on the run, he got a part as an extra in the Nelson Eddy/Jeanette MacDonald film Rose Marie, scenes of which were filmed near Lake Tahoe. He is credited in the film under his real name.

Yreka rebellion 

On November 27, 1941, a group of young men gained national media attention when, brandishing hunting rifles for dramatic effect, they stopped traffic on U.S. Route 99 south of Yreka, and handed out copies of a Proclamation of Independence, stating that the State of Jefferson was in "patriotic rebellion against the States of California and Oregon" and would continue to "secede every Thursday until further notice."

The secession movement ended quickly, though not before Del Norte County District Attorney John Leon Childs of Crescent City was inaugurated as governor of the State of Jefferson on December 4, 1941.

The first blow was the death of Mayor Gable on December 2, followed by the attack on Pearl Harbor on December 7. Those in favor of secession focused their efforts on the war effort, which crippled the movement.

Geography

Natural history
The official city flower of Yreka is the Yreka phlox (Phlox hirsuta).

The only known specimen of Calochortus monanthus, the single-flowered mariposa lily, was collected near Yreka along the banks of the Shasta River, by botanist Edward Lee Greene, in June 1876.

Nearby settlements
Nearby places include:

Climate 
According to the Köppen climate classification system, Yreka qualifies as having a hot-summer Mediterranean climate (Csa), but almost qualifies as having a warm-summer Mediterrean climate (Csb). The area features hot, dry summers and cool winters with regular snowfall. There is a high degree of diurnal temperature variation, especially in the summer.

Demographics

2010
The 2010 United States Census reported that Yreka had a population of 7,765. The racial makeup of Yreka was 6,495 (83.6%) White, 57 (0.7%) African American, 491 (6.3%) Native American, 94 (1.2%) Asian, 9 (0.1%) Pacific Islander, 168 (2.2%) from other races, and 451 (5.8%) from two or more races. Hispanic or Latino of any race were 753 persons (9.7%).

The Census reported that 7,718 people (99.4% of the population) lived in households, 33 (0.4%) lived in non-institutionalized group quarters, and 14 (0.2%) were institutionalized.

There were 3,394 households, out of which 983 (29.0%) had children under the age of 18 living in them, 1,338 (39.4%) were married couples, 471 (13.9%) had a female householder with no husband present, 160 (4.7%) had a male householder with no wife present.  There were 269 (7.9%) unmarried couples, and 17 (0.5%) gay couples. 1,202 households (35.4%) were made up of individuals, and 636 (18.7%) had someone living alone who was 65 years of age or older. The average household size was 2.27.  There were 1,969 families (58.0% of all households); the average family size was 2.92.

The population was spread out, with 1,871 people (24.1%) under the age of 18, 678 people (8.7%) aged 18 to 24, 1,603 people (20.6%) aged 25 to 44, 2,119 people (27.3%) aged 45 to 64, and 1,494 people (19.2%) who were 65 years of age or older.  The median age was 41.7 years. For every 100 females, there were 89.5 males.  For every 100 females age 18 and over, there were 84.5 males.

The homeowner vacancy rate was 2.4%; the rental vacancy rate was 6.7%.  3,895 people (50.2% of the population) lived in owner-occupied housing units and 3,823 people (49.2%) lived in rental housing units.

2000
As of the census of 2000, there were 7,290 people, 3,114 households, and 1,880 families residing in the city. The racial makeup of the city was 86.6% White, 0.5% African American, 6.0% Native American, 1.8% Asian, 0.1% Pacific Islander, 1.7% from other races, and 3.3% from two or more races. Hispanics or Latinos of any race were 5.4% of the population.

There were 3,114 households, out of which 29.4% had children under the age of 18 living with them, 43.8% were married couples, 13.0% had a female householder with no husband present, and 39.6% were non-families. 34.8% of all households were made up of individuals, and 17.2% had someone living alone who was 65 years of age or older. The average household size was 2.27 and the average family size was 2.92.

In the city, the population was spread out, with 25.5% under the age of 18, 7.8% from 18 to 24, 23.5% from 25 to 44, 23.8% from 45 to 64, and 19.4% who were 65 years of age or older. The median age was 41. For every 100 females, there were 88.3 males. For every 100 females, age 18 and over, there were 83.9 males.

The median income for a household in the city was $27,398, and the median income for a family was $37,448. Males had a median income of $31,632 versus $23,986 for females. The per capita income for the city was $16,664. About 17.5% of families and 21.2% of the population were below the poverty line, including 33.6% of those under age 18 and 8.8% of those age 65 or over.

Economy

Tourists visit Yreka because it is at the northern edge of the Shasta Cascade area of northern California. The core of the historic downtown, along West Miner Street, is listed as an historic district on the National Register of Historic Places, as well as a California Historical Landmark. Yreka is home to the Siskiyou County Museum and a number of Gold Rush-era monuments and parks. Visitors also come to enjoy trout fishing in the nearby Klamath, Sacramento and McCloud Rivers, or to see and climb Mount Shasta, Castle Crags or the Trinity Alps. Visitors also ski (both alpine and cross-country), or bike or hike to the waterfalls, streams and lakes in the area, including nearby Falls of the McCloud River, Burney Falls, Mossbrae Falls, Lake Siskiyou, Castle Lake and Shasta Lake.

The town hosts Gold Rush Days every year in June.

In addition, because it is the county seat of Siskiyou County, a number of businesses related to the county courts, county recorder, and other official county functions are in the city. Butte Valley National Grassland is in northern Siskiyou County, near the Oregon border, but is administered from Yreka offices.

Government

Education
Yreka is home to a branch campus of the College of the Siskiyous which hosts the Rural Health Science Institute and Administration of Justice programs. The college is one of 10 California community colleges to offer on-campus housing. High-school buses carry students from towns that would not otherwise be able to fund a secondary education.

In Yreka, the gold-mining era is commemorated with a gold museum, as well as with a remnant of a silver mining operation in Greenhorn Park. The Yreka Union High School District sports mascot is a gold miner. School colors are red and gold. Yreka High School was the first high school in the county, founded in 1894. It has 11 feeder districts that serve the approximately  county area.

The Yreka elementary school district is composed of Evergreen Elementary as well as the Jackson Street Middle School.

Media
The city and county are served by a daily newspaper, the Siskiyou Daily News, as well as 13 FM and one AM station.  Yreka Community Television Channel 4 (commonly known as YCTV 4) is a small public-educational-and-government-access cable TV run by the city of Yreka.

Infrastructure

Transportation
Interstate 5 is the primary north–south route through Yreka, connecting Redding and Sacramento to the south and the Oregon border to the north. Interstate 5 through the city follows the former path of the Siskiyou Trail, which stretched from California's Central Valley to Oregon's Willamette Valley.

California State Route 3 runs east to Montague, and west to Fort Jones and Weaverville. California State Route 263 serves as a business loop of Interstate 5 through the northern part of the city.

General aviation uses the Montague Airport in Montague,  to the east.

Notable people
 
Jodi Arias dropped out of high school in Yreka and was living there in June 2008, when she drove to Mesa, Arizona to see her ex-boyfriend Travis Alexander, whom she was later convicted of murdering in his home. She was found guilty of first degree murder on May 8, 2013.
Erik Bennett, Major League Baseball player, was born in Yreka.
Charles Earl Bowles, a.k.a. Black Bart, robbed a number of stagecoaches on the trails leading to or from Yreka in the 1880s.
Leander Clark, an Iowa state legislator and Union Army officer, prospected for gold in the Yreka area, returning home to the east coast via the isthmus of Panama in 1852, $3,000 to $4,000 richer.
Edward Silsby Farrington, United States federal judge, was born in Yreka.
Marco Grifantini, baseball player, was born in Yreka.
William Irwin, Siskiyou representative and later governor of California.
Ross McCloud was Siskiyou County surveyor in the middle 1850s and laid out for improvement many of the trails and road courses still in use today.
Patrick F. McManus was a sutler killed in the Yreka area while hauling mail.   
Tim Meamber, American football player, was born in Yreka.
Richie Myers, baseball player, was a resident of Yreka when he died there.
John Otto was the first park custodian at Colorado National Monument, and was a key advocate for its creation and its later inclusion in the National Park System. He spent his final 20 years on his mining claim near Yreka and was buried in a pauper's grave.
Eric Pianka, biologist, grew up in Yreka.
Elijah Steele, an early Northern California pioneer, state legislator, and Indian agent who tried to prevent the Modoc War, lived in Yreka when he was Superior Court Judge for Siskiyou County from 1879 to 1883.

Palindromes 
"Yreka Bakery" is a palindrome. The loss of the "B" in a bakery sign read from the reverse is mentioned as a possible source of the name Yreka in Mark Twain's autobiography. The original Yreka Bakery was founded in 1856 by baker Frederick Deng. The palindrome was recognized early on: "spell Yreka Bakery backwards and you will know where to get a good loaf of bread" is quoted as an ad in the May 23, 1863, Yreka Semi-Weekly Journal and states that 12 loaves cost $1. The Yreka Bakery moved eventually to its longtime location, 322 West Miner Street, where it remained under several ownerships until it closed in 1965 on retirement of the baker "Martin", and clerk Alta Hudson. Another Yreka Bakery opened in a different location in 1974, but is no longer in business. Author Martin Gardner mentioned that Yreka Bakery was in business on West Miner Street in Yreka, but it was pointed out by readers "the Yreka Bakery no longer existed. In 1970 the original premises were occupied by the art store Yrella Gallery, also a palindrome". The historic Brown-Nickell-Authenrieth Building, 322–324 West Miner Street, houses a restaurant.

See also 
 Yreka Western Railroad

References

External links
 
 Yreka Chamber of Commerce 
 Siskiyou County Historical Society 
 Siskiyou County Museum 
 Siskiyou Daily News
Images of Yreka from the Eastman’s Originals Collection,  Special Collections Dept., University of California, Davis.
 

 
Cities in Siskiyou County, California
County seats in California
Mining communities of the California Gold Rush
Historic districts on the National Register of Historic Places in California
National Register of Historic Places in Siskiyou County, California
Populated places established in 1851
Populated places established in 1857
1851 establishments in California
1857 establishments in California
Incorporated cities and towns in California